Leone Carpi (1810 or 1820 in Bologna, Italy – 1898) was a Jewish Italian political economist and journalist who took part in the struggles of the Risorgimento. In 1849 he was prominent in the defense of the Roman Republic. After its fall, he went into exile.

Carpi was the first Jewish deputy elected to the Italian Parliament, by the city of Ferrara. On the expiration of his term, he divided his time between Bologna and Rome, where he was a contributor to Popolo Romano. He threw much light on the social and moral conditions of the new united Italy by the information that he collected in all departments of the government.

Among his works may be mentioned:

Dell'Emigrazione Italiano all'Estero, nei Suoi Rapporti coll'Agricoltura, coll'Industria, e col Commercio, Florence, 1871
Delle Colonie e dell'Emigrazione degl'Italiani all'Estero nei Loro Rapporti coll'Agricoltura, Industria, e Commercio, Milan, 1874
Statistica Illustrata dell'Emigrazione, Rome, 1878
L'Italia Vivente, Studi Sociali, Milan, 1878
Il Risorgimento Italiano: Biografie Storico-Politiche d'Illustri Italiani Contemporanei, Milan, 1884
L'Italia all'Estero, Rome, 1887

In his Dell' Emigranzione, he reported that about 555,000 "Italians" lived in what he called Italy's "colonies" abroad. Nearly half of these lived in South America, mainly in Argentina, Uruguay and southern Brazil. Nine per cent lived in North America, mostly in the United States. Another third lived in transalpine Europe and 15% in North Africa, Greece and the eastern Mediterranean.

The only work written by him relating directly to Jewish topics was his Alcune Parole Sugli Israeliti in Occasione di un Decreto Pontifico d'Interdizione, Florence, 1847.

Notes

References
 De Gubernatis, Dizionario Biografico degli Scrittori Contemporanei, Florence, 1879.
 Romanelli, R., "Carpi, Leone", in Dizionario Biografico degli Italiani, vol. 20, Rome, 1977, pp. 599–604.

External links
Donna Gabaccia, "Class, Exile, and Nationalism at Home and Abroad: The Italian Risorgimento" (his work on Italian "colonies")

19th-century births
1898 deaths
Italian economists
19th-century Italian Jews
Italian male journalists
Year of birth uncertain
19th-century Italian journalists
19th-century Italian male writers
19th-century Italian writers
Writers from Bologna